Don Kirshner's Rock Concert is an American television music variety show that ran during the 1970s and early 1980s, created and produced by Don Kirshner and syndicated to television stations, initially through Viacom Enterprises, and later through Syndicast. It premiered on September 27, 1973, with a performance by The Rolling Stones and The Doobie Brothers; its last episode was in 1981.

History

Kirshner had been executive producer and "creative consultant" on ABC's In Concert series which debuted with two shows in November and December 1972, in the 11:30 p.m. time slot usually held by The Dick Cavett Show. The programs, taped at the Hofstra Playhouse at Hofstra University in Hempstead, N.Y., featured performances by Alice Cooper; Curtis Mayfield; Seals & Crofts; Bo Diddley; The Allman Brothers Band; Chuck Berry; Blood, Sweat & Tears; Poco; The Steve Miller Band; and Joe Walsh. Their rating more than doubled the average rating of The Dick Cavett Show and even topped NBC's The Tonight Show Starring Johnny Carson in some markets and among viewers under the age of 35.

In Concert became a bi-weekly series in January 1973. "Right now, we have more artists than we know what to do with," Kirshner's music director Wally Gold told The Washington Post late in 1972. "We pay them scale to appear, which is way below what they usually get for a concert, but they know that the publicity is well worth it. So everyone wants to be on. We're getting hundreds of calls. At first, we had to beg the artists to appear. Now they're begging us."

In September 1973, Kirshner left In Concert—he received producing credits for three more shows—to launch his own syndicated "Don Kirshner's Rock Concert." The premiere, on September 27, 1973, featured The Rolling Stones, taped in London, in their first appearance on American TV in more than four years.

The program featured many of the popular performers of the day during its run and other notable guests included Rush, The Eagles, KISS, Foghat, The Ramones, Kansas, Van Morrison and The Allman Brothers Band. Kirshner personally commissioned rock designer Jim Evans to create a special logo for the show.

The show was hosted by Kirshner up till the last season. His on-air delivery was described as flat by viewers. Paul Shaffer often lampooned him in a convincing impersonation on Saturday Night Live, which went head-to-head against "Rock Concert" in some cities between 1975 and 1981. In its final season the show was hosted by Kirshner's son and daughter.

As with The Midnight Special, Don Kirshner's Rock Concert was noted for featuring live performances, which was unusual for the period since most television appearances at that time used lip-synching to prerecorded music. Kirshner's show was recorded in stereo utilizing simulcast to broadcast on FM Stereo radio stations and early Cable TV.

The series also occasionally aired vintage footage of older acts such as Bill Haley & His Comets, Dusty Springfield and Ritchie Valens, which due to the age of the recordings were broadcast in mono.

Don Kirshner's Rock Concert library is owned by SOFA Entertainment and Historic films.

Performers who appeared on Don Kirshner's Rock Concert 
10cc
A Taste of Honey
ABBA
The Allman Brothers Band
Ambrosia
Andy Gibb 
Angel
Argent
Average White Band
Bad Company
Badfinger
Bachman-Turner Overdrive
Bar Kays
Black Sabbath
Brownsville Station
Joan Baez
Bee Gees
Pat Benatar
Black Oak Arkansas
Blood, Sweat & Tears
Blue Öyster Cult
Brooklyn Dreams
Cameo
David Bowie
Dr. Hook
Dr. John
Eric Burdon
The Byrds
Irene Cara
Harry Chapin
Cheap Trick
Alice Cooper
Jim Croce
Sarah Dash
Devo
Dixie Dregs
The Doobie Brothers
Donna Summer
Eagles
Earth, Wind & Fire
Edgar Winter Group
Electric Light Orchestra
Emerson, Lake & Palmer
Bryan Ferry
Fleetwood Mac
Flying Burrito Brothers
Focus
Foghat
Rory Gallagher
Genesis
Golden Earring
Grand Funk Railroad
The Guess Who
George Harrison
The Hollies
Herbie Hancock
Hot Tuna
The Isley Brothers

James Gang
Rick James
Billy Joel
Journey
Waylon Jennings
Kansas
KC and the Sunshine Band
B. B. King
KISS
Gladys Knight and the Pips
Patti LaBelle
Lake (German band)
Lenny Williams
Lynyrd Skynyrd
Mahavishnu Orchestra
Mahogany Rush
Meat Loaf
Melissa Manchester
Manfred Mann's Earth Band
Frank Marino
Don McLean
Molly Hatchet
Montrose
Mother's Finest
Maria Muldaur
New Birth
New York Dolls
Nitty Gritty Dirt Band
Ted Nugent
Gary Numan
Ohio Players
Osibisa
Outlaws
The Ozark Mountain Daredevils
Robert Palmer
The Police
Billy Preston
Prince & The Revolution
Pure Prairie League with Vince Gill
Queen
The Ramones
Lou Rawls
Rainbow
Raspberries
Helen Reddy
Lou Reed
Martha Reeves
REO Speedwagon
Vicki Sue Robinson
The Rolling Stones
Linda Ronstadt
Todd Rundgren
Rush
Rose Royce
Santana
The Sex Pistols
Seals & Crofts
Sensational Alex Harvey Band
Slade
Slave
Sly & the Family Stone
Southside Johnny & the Asbury Jukes
Sparks
Jimmie Spheeris
The Spinners (American R&B group)
The Stampeders
Starz
Steely Dan
Steppenwolf
Steve Miller Band
Stephanie Mills
Cat Stevens
The Sylvers
Sylvester
Switch
Bram Tchaikovsky
The Temptations
Tim Weisberg
Marc Bolan and T. Rex
Ike & Tina Turner
UFO
Uriah Heep
Village People
Joe Walsh
Bay City Rollers
Van Halen
Van Morrison
Waylon Jennings
Walter Murphy
War
Weather Report
Wild Cherry
Wishbone Ash
Stevie Wonder
Zebra

In popular culture
The TV series SCTV satirized Don Kirshner's Rock Concert as Lee A. Iacocca's Rock Concert in an episode of the same name; the premiere of season 3. Dave Thomas appeared as Lee Iacocca asking for government help to subsidize the costs of running the show, a satirical take on his asking the government to bail out Chrysler around the same time. The skit also mentions Paul Shaffer's satires of him on Saturday Night Live and also has a performance of the song "Tie a Yellow Ribbon Round the Ole Oak Tree" but sung as "Tie a Yellow Ribbon Round a Dodge Omni" sung by him and Tony Orlando (Tony Rosato). The skit appears on the 'Best of the Early Years' DVD.

See also
The Midnight Special
List of late night network TV programs

References

Citations

General sources 
McNeil, Alexander M. (1980). Total Television, New York: Penguin Books, Ltd. .

External links 
 
 

1970s American late-night television series
1970s American music television series
1970s American variety television series
1973 American television series debuts
1980s American late-night television series
1980s American music television series
1980s American variety television series
1981 American television series endings
English-language television shows
Pop music television series
Rock music television series
First-run syndicated television programs in the United States